Platymaia alcocki is a species of crab in the family Inachidae.

Distribution 

It is found between the depths of 208 to 632.5 meters deep, and near Madagascar and the Philippines. It has been found in deep-water environments off the cost of Thailand and in the Indian Ocean

References

Majoidea